The 2007 Halton Borough Council election took place on 3 May 2007 to elect members of Halton Unitary Council in Cheshire, England. One third of the council was up for election and the Labour party stayed in overall control of the council.

After the election, the composition of the council was
Labour 33
Liberal Democrat 15
Conservative 8

Campaign
19 of the 56 seats on the council were contested in the election including the seat of the Conservative group leader on the council, David Findon. Other candidates included the former Labour mayor, Peter Lloyd-Jones, standing in Norton North after losing his seat in the 2006 election and one British National Party candidate, Andrew Taylor, in Appleton ward.

The campaign saw controversy over the possibility of transferring hospital services from Halton to Warrington, with a campaigner against the move standing for the Liberal Democrats in Halton Brook against the Labour chairman of the North Cheshire Hospitals Trust.

Results
The results saw Labour hold their majority on the council with 33 seats despite losing 2 in the election. The Labour losses were Allan Massey in Halton Brook ward and the longest serving councillor Arthur Cole in Castlefield, who lost by only 3 votes. Both seats were gained by Liberal Democrats who ended the election with 15 councillors, while the Conservatives still had 8. Overall turnout in the election was 27.33%.

Ward results

References

2007 English local elections
2007
2000s in Cheshire